"Don't Give In to Him" is a song written by Gary Usher, produced by Dick Glasser and recorded by Gary Puckett & The Union Gap for their 1969 album, The New Gary Puckett and the Union Gap Album.

Chart performance
The song reached #15 in the US, #10 in Canada and #24 in Australia in 1969.

Cover Versions
The Ventures released a cover of the song on their 1969 album, Hawaii Five-O.

References

1969 singles
1969 songs
Songs written by Gary Usher
Gary Puckett & The Union Gap songs
The Ventures songs
Columbia Records singles
Song recordings produced by Dick Glasser